Machu Pitumarka (hispanicized spelling Machu Pitumarca, Machupitumarca) is an archaeological site with ruins of walls in Peru. It is situated in the Cusco Region, Canchis Province, Pitumarca District. Machu Pitumarka lies on a hill northeast of Pitumarka (Pitumarca) at the southern shore of the river Ch'illkamayu.

See also 
 Ayamach'ay
 Llamachayuq Qaqa

References 

Archaeological sites in Peru
Archaeological sites in Cusco Region